Walkers may refer to:

Art, entertainment, and media

Fictional entities
 Walkers, one name for zombies in The Walking Dead (franchise)

Literature
 Walkers (novel), a 1980 horror novel by Gary Brandner

Music
 The Walkers (Danish band), a Danish glam rock band
 The Walkers (Dutch band), a Dutch band
 The Walkers, British band 1983 with Camelle Hinds and Canute Washington

Brands and enterprises
 Walker Scott, a.k.a. Walker's, a former San Diego-based department store
 Walkers (law firm), a Cayman Islands-based offshore law firm
 Walkers (snack foods), British snack food manufacturer
 Walkers Limited, railway vehicle manufacturer in Maryborough, Queensland
 Walker's department store, or Walkers, a former California-based department store
 Walker's Nonsuch, an English toffee manufacturer
 Walkers Shortbread, a Scottish manufacturer of shortbread, biscuits, cookies and crackers

Other uses
 Walkers, Virginia, United States
 Walkers Stadium, the former name of the home of Leicester City football club

See also
 Walker (disambiguation)
 The Walkers (disambiguation)